The following is a list of Michigan State Historic Sites in Eaton County, Michigan. Sites marked with a dagger (†) are also listed on the National Register of Historic Places in Eaton County, Michigan.


Current listings

See also
 National Register of Historic Places listings in Eaton County, Michigan

Sources
 Historic Sites Online – Eaton County. Michigan State Housing Developmental Authority. Accessed January 22, 2011.

References

Eaton County
State Historic Sites
Tourist attractions in Eaton County, Michigan